Wattenbach may refer to:

 Wattenbach (Inn), river in Tyrol, Austria
 Wilhelm Wattenbach (1819-1897), German historian